Hahns Peak Village is an unincorporated community in Routt County, Colorado, United States. It is located north of Clark along County Road 129, and just east of Steamboat Lake State Park. The village is named for Hahns Peak, which is nearby.

History
The village functioned as the Routt County Seat from seat from 1877 to 1912. It's the oldest permanent settlement in the northwestern part of Routt County.

An 1800s cabin, The Wirther Cabin, is restored and now sits on Main Street. The Hahns Peak Schoolhouse, which operated from 1912 to 1943, is also on Main Street. The school is listed on the National Register of Historic Places.

See also

References

External links

 Hahns Peak Area Historical Society

Unincorporated communities in Routt County, Colorado
Unincorporated communities in Colorado
Former county seats in Colorado